The 2014–15 Halifax Rainmen season was the fourth season of the franchise in the National Basketball League of Canada. The Rainmen finished the season with a 20–12, placing second overall in the league. They forfeited Game 7 of the 2015 Finals following a pre-game brawl with their opponents, the Windsor Express. It was their second appearance and defeat in the Finals.

Draft

Roster

Bankruptcy 
On July 6, 2015, over one month after forfeiting the 2015 NBL Canada Finals, the Rainmen filed for bankruptcy. In a release, owner Andre Levingston said, "While it's disappointing to see this chapter end, I can hold my head high knowing that we did everything we could have done. I love this game and I love this city." It was later announced that the team would have new ownership, although it was unclear whether the nickname would remain the same.

References 

2014-15
2014–15 NBL Canada season
2014–15 in Canadian basketball by team